Maximillian Miles Christensen (born September 23, 1983), best known under the alias Maximilian Dood, is an American YouTuber and Twitch streamer. Considered a prominent figure in the fighting game community, Christensen primarily makes video content on various fighting games, such as Street Fighter, Mortal Kombat and Killer Instinct. He is also known for his grassroots efforts to organize fighting game tournaments along with his campaigns to revive various fighting game series.

Early and personal life 
Maximillian Christensen was born on September 23, 1983, and is a native of Los Angeles, California. Before becoming a YouTuber, he had worked as an animator and illustrator. Christensen is married; his wife, Jessica, gave birth to their daughter, Ripley, in 2020.

In October 2021, Christensen's financial information on Twitch was revealed after a massive leak; between August 2019 and October 2021, Christensen had made over $1.4 million.

Internet career

Video content 
Christensen created his Maximilian Dood YouTube channel in 2007, and after being fired from his job as an online video game producer in 2011 began to make videos as a full-time job. His content primarily revolves around fighting games, covering titles from fighting game series such as Street Fighter, Mortal Kombat, Tekken and Soulcalibur. As of 2021 his YouTube channel has over 1.4 million subscribers and his Twitch channel has over 970,000 followers.

Christensen's style of content combines aspects of informative walkthroughs and reaction-based playthroughs. He created the web series Assist Me! for Capcom's Marvel Vs. Capcom 3 game which discussed the game's mechanics, characters and various strategies. In his Mortal Kombat videos, he showcased how to perform different fatalities alongside humorous "hidden character" intros. Several of his Mortal Kombat videos which featured such gruesome fatalities were eventually demonetized and age-restricted in 2019, following the release of Mortal Kombat 11. In January 2017, his video on Injustice 2 received coverage for showcasing the improvements made to the character models on the game from its initial footage in 2016, detailing the flaws on character faces such as that of Supergirl and Wonder Woman and speculating that NetherRealm Studios had polished the game before its initial release. Besides fighting games, Christensen has made videos on other video games such as showcasing a Bayonetta 2 easter egg involving a reference to the Nintendo series Star Fox, which received coverage from Eurogamer in 2014.

Following the closure of Machinima in 2019, Christensen was dropped from the multi-channel network due to his Assist Me and Boss Rage videos receiving copyright claims for their usage of music.

FGC activities 
As a prominent member of the fighting game community (FGC), Christensen is known for organizing grassroots fighting game online tournaments alongside campaigning for the revival of several fighting games. In August 2021, Christensen created a social media campaign advocating for a rerelease of the 2000 fighting game Marvel vs. Capcom 2, which had been delisted from multiple online stores due to licensing issues between Marvel and Capcom; initially slated to make a comeback in Evo 2020, the game ultimately did not make an appearance due to the cancellation of the event. Christensen's campaign led to #FREEMVC2 trending on Twitter and Mike Mika, the studio head for Digital Eclipse, expressing interest in re-releasing the game. In June 2019, two years prior to his Marvel Vs. Capcom 2 campaign, he had created a Killer Instinct campaign to revive the series which also trended on Twitter.

In January 2021, Christensen hosted a Killer Instinct tournament which he streamed on Twitch under a partnership with Twitch Rivals. In addition to being a fan of the series, he had previously worked with developer Iron Galaxy to create promotional material and character trailers for the reboot. The stream reached over 41,000 concurrent viewers. On May 24, 2021, Christensen also hosted a Mortal Kombat X Lives tournament with Ryan "Mr. Aquaman" Kablik hosting the qualifiers on his YouTube channel two days prior. However, the tournament was stopped and subsequently postponed due to an incident involving multiple players having their personal information leaked during the livestream. Christensen and Twitch Rivals announced that they will hold the second part of the event in the future.

Other works 
Christensen appeared in two episodes of Did You Know Gaming? in 2014, discussing trivia on Street Fighter and Killer Instinct. In 2021, it was announced that he will appear as an assist character in the beat 'em up game Jitsu Squad.

See also 
 Esports

References

External links 
 
 
 

1983 births
Living people
American YouTubers
Gaming YouTubers
YouTube channels launched in 2007
Video game commentators
Let's Players
Twitch (service) streamers
People from Los Angeles